János Borsó (born 18 April 1953) is a retired Hungarian international football player.

Club career 
János Borsó was one of the most influential players of MTK Budapest in the late 1970s and early 1980s. He is one of the rare examples of footballers who have played for 15 consecutive years in the same club. Next, he moved abroad to Yugoslavia where he represented, in the season 1985–1986, a Serbian club FK Vojvodina. Before retiring, he also played in Austrian Bundesliga side SC Eisenstadt, Hungarian lower league III. Kerületi TVE and back in Austria where he played his last season with lower-league, SK Pama.

International career 
On March 26, 1980, he made his debut for the Hungarian national team.

He also played for Hungary at U-21 and U-23 levels, and also, for Hungarian Olympic team.

References

External links 
 
 
 Goals for MTK at mtkhungaria.hu
 Appearances and time period in MTK at mtkhungaria.hu

Living people
1953 births
Sportspeople from Pécs
Hungarian footballers
Hungary international footballers
Hungarian expatriate footballers
MTK Budapest FC players
Expatriate footballers in Yugoslavia
FK Vojvodina players
Yugoslav First League players
Hungarian expatriate sportspeople in Yugoslavia
Expatriate footballers in Austria
SC Eisenstadt players
Hungarian expatriate sportspeople in Austria
III. Kerületi TUE footballers
Association football midfielders